Eggstone in San Diego is the debut album by Swedish indie pop band Eggstone, first released in Sweden in October 1992. The album was recorded over a period of a year, using second hand reel-to-reel tapes of dansbandsmusik, sometimes causing previous recordings to bleed through. Eggstone in San Diego is credited as being the album that established the "Tambourine Sound" and "introduced a completely new colour scheme to Swedish pop".

In June 2013, the album was ranked as the 39th-best Swedish album ever by Sonic Magazine.

The album is one of the titles in the book Tusen svenska klassiker (2009).

Eggstone in San Diego was re-issued on vinyl in 1997 by Vibrafon Records, and again by Crunchy Frog Records in 2017.

Track listing 
 All songs written by Eggstone
 "Ooh Ooh Ma Ma Mine" – 4:13
 "Shooting Time" – 3:29
 "Those Words" – 3:42
 "Sun King" – 3:31
 "Have You Seen Mary" – 2:33
 "Suffocation at Sea" – 3:36
 "Wrong Heaven" – 3:46
 "Go Back" – 3:23
 "Can't Come Close Enough" – 3:32
 "If You Say" – 2:27
 "Beach Boy" – 3:37
 "She's Perfect" – 4:27
 "See the Good Things" – 4:10

References

External links 
 Eggstone web site: detailed 'Eggstone in San Diego' information

1992 debut albums
Eggstone albums